The arrondissement of Angers is an arrondissement of France in the Maine-et-Loire department in the Pays de la Loire region. It has 66 communes.

Composition

The communes of the arrondissement of Angers, and their INSEE codes, are:
 
 Angers (49007)
 Aubigné-sur-Layon (49012)
 Avrillé (49015)
 Baracé (49017)
 Beaucouzé (49020)
 Beaulieu-sur-Layon (49022)
 Béhuard (49028)
 Bellevigne-en-Layon (49345)
 Blaison-Saint-Sulpice (49029)
 Bouchemaine (49035)
 Briollay (49048)
 Brissac Loire Aubance (49050)
 Cantenay-Épinard (49055)
 Chalonnes-sur-Loire (49063)
 Champtocé-sur-Loire (49068)
 La Chapelle-Saint-Laud (49076)
 Chaudefonds-sur-Layon (49082)
 Cheffes (49090)
 Cornillé-les-Caves (49107)
 Corzé (49110)
 Denée (49120)
 Durtal (49127)
 Écouflant (49129)
 Écuillé (49130)
 Étriché (49132)
 Feneu (49135)
 Les Garennes sur Loire (49167)
 Huillé-Lézigné (49174)
 Ingrandes-Le Fresne sur Loire (49160)
 Jarzé-Villages (49163)
 Loire-Authion (49307)
 Longuenée-en-Anjou (49200)
 Marcé (49188)
 Montigné-lès-Rairies (49209)
 Montreuil-Juigné (49214)
 Montreuil-sur-Loir (49216)
 Morannes sur Sarthe-Daumeray (49220)
 Mozé-sur-Louet (49222)
 Mûrs-Erigné (49223)
 Le Plessis-Grammoire (49241)
 Les Ponts-de-Cé (49246)
 La Possonnière (49247)
 Les Rairies (49257)
 Rives-du-Loir-en-Anjou (49377)
 Rochefort-sur-Loire (49259)
 Saint-Barthélemy-d'Anjou (49267)
 Saint-Clément-de-la-Place (49271)
 Sainte-Gemmes-sur-Loire (49278)
 Saint-Georges-sur-Loire (49283)
 Saint-Germain-des-Prés (49284)
 Saint-Jean-de-la-Croix (49288)
 Saint-Lambert-la-Potherie (49294)
 Saint-Léger-de-Linières (49298)
 Saint-Martin-du-Fouilloux (49306)
 Saint-Melaine-sur-Aubance (49308)
 Sarrigné (49326)
 Savennières (49329)
 Seiches-sur-le-Loir (49333)
 Sermaise (49334)
 Soulaines-sur-Aubance (49338)
 Soulaire-et-Bourg (49339)
 Terranjou (49086)
 Tiercé (49347)
 Trélazé (49353)
 Val-du-Layon (49292)
 Verrières-en-Anjou (49323)

History

The arrondissement of Angers was created in 1800. At the January 2017 reorganisation of the arrondissements of Maine-et-Loire, it gained two communes from the arrondissement of Saumur, and it lost four communes to the arrondissement of Saumur and four communes to the arrondissement of Segré.

As a result of the reorganisation of the cantons of France which came into effect in 2015, the borders of the cantons are no longer related to the borders of the arrondissements. The cantons of the arrondissement of Angers were, as of January 2015:

 Angers-Centre
 Angers-Est
 Angers-Nord
 Angers-Nord-Est
 Angers-Nord-Ouest
 Angers-Ouest
 Angers-Sud
 Angers-Trélazé
 Beaufort-en-Vallée
 Chalonnes-sur-Loire
 Durtal
 Le Louroux-Béconnais
 Les Ponts-de-Cé
 Saint-Georges-sur-Loire
 Seiches-sur-le-Loir
 Thouarcé
 Tiercé

References

Angers